Robert Andersson (born 24 November 1969) is a Swedish handball player who competed in the 1996 Summer Olympics and in the 2000 Summer Olympics.

He was born in Ystad.

In 1992 he was a member of the Swedish handball team won the silver medal in the Olympic tournament. He played six match and scored six goals.

Four years later he was part of the Swedish team which won the silver medal again. He played two matches and scored one goal.

External links
profile

1969 births
Living people
Swedish male handball players
Olympic handball players of Sweden
Handball players at the 1992 Summer Olympics
Handball players at the 1996 Summer Olympics
Olympic silver medalists for Sweden
Olympic medalists in handball
People from Ystad
Medalists at the 1996 Summer Olympics
Medalists at the 1992 Summer Olympics
20th-century Swedish people